Ljiljana Nikolovska (also spelled Nikolovski or Nikoloski; born 24 August 1964) is a Croatian singer who rose to prominence as the lead vocalist for the Split-based pop music act Magazin.

Born in Split, Nikolovska is of paternal Macedonian descent. She recorded eight albums, and appeared on numerous compilation albums with Magazin from 1982 to mid-1990 and other bands and projects to this day. She recorded a solo album in 1996 named Let for Croatia Records.

Since 1993, Nikolovska has been married to musician Pete Mazich. They have a son, and live in San Pedro, California, United States, where they own a Recording Studio, record, play and co-produce projects with numerous musicians and bands of other nationalities. Nikolovska does mostly charity work and recordings that contribute to those in need (most noted for "Doctors Without Borders").

Discography

References

External links
YouTube/LjiljanaNikolovska
Facebook/LjiljanaNikolovskaOfficial

1964 births
Living people
21st-century Croatian women singers
Musicians from Split, Croatia
Croatian people of Macedonian descent
Croatian emigrants to the United States
Croatian pop singers
20th-century Croatian women singers